Joško Gvardiol (born 23 January 2002) is a Croatian professional footballer who plays as a defender for Bundesliga club RB Leipzig and the Croatia national team. Gvardiol plays as a centre-back, though he has often been utilized as a left-back.

Club career

Early career
Gvardiol started playing football at the age of seven when his father, once an amateur player in his native Novigrad, took him to Trešnjevka. While there, he was spotted by Lokomotiva and Zagreb; however, at the last minute he received an offer from Dinamo Zagreb which his family accepted.

Initially, he played as a left-back or a central midfielder until Dinamo academy coach Dalibor Poldrugač moved him to the centre-back position. Soon after, Gvardiol started drawing interest from prominent European clubs, including Manchester City, Lille, Borussia Dortmund, RB Leipzig, Bayern Munich, Ajax, Inter Milan and Roma. He played a key part in Dinamo's 2018–19 UEFA Youth League campaign, where they reached quarter-finals before losing 4–2 to Chelsea in a penalty shootout. After being impressed by his performances for youth teams, senior Dinamo coach Nenad Bjelica called Gvardiol up to the senior team for pre-season games in Slovenia in summer 2019. On 2 July, he scored in a 2–0 friendly win over Austria Klagenfurt. On 10 October 2019, he was included in The Guardians Next Generation list.

Dinamo Zagreb
2019–20 season
Gvardiol made his league debut for the senior Dinamo team on 18 October in a 4–2 victory over Gorica, coming on for Mario Gavranović in the 87th minute. In his second league appearance for the club on 2 November, he scored the only goal in a 1–0 victory over Inter Zaprešić. That made him the sixth youngest league goalscorer for Dinamo, after Alen Halilović, Mateo Kovačić, Niko Kranjčar, Ante Ćorić and Tin Jedvaj. On 12 February 2020, in a UEFA Youth League play-off against Dynamo Kyiv, Gvardiol successfully converted a penalty in a shootout as Dinamo won 4–3 and qualified for the round of 16. In the round of 16 against Bayern Munich on 4 March, Gvardiol deflected Leon Dajaku's shot into his own net to set the score to 2–2. In the resulting shootout, he successfully converted his attempt again as Dinamo won 6–5 and progressed to the quarter-finals. On 25 June, Gvardiol signed a five-year contract with Dinamo. On 5 July, in the derby against Rijeka when the league title was already mathematically secured, Gvardiol deflected Franko Andrijašević's shot into his own net as Rijeka won 2–0, which would eventually cost coach Igor Jovićević his job.

2020–21 season
On 26 August, in the Champions League qualifier against CFR Cluj, Gvardiol came on for Mario Gavranović in the 54th minute following Kévin Théophile-Catherine's red card. The game led to a penalty shootout, with Gvardiol successfully converting his attempt, as Dinamo won 6–5 and progressed to the third qualifying round. In late August and early September, the media reported on the interest of the newly promoted Premier League side Leeds United, whose manager Marcelo Bielsa offered €22 million to sign the 18-year-old; however, Gvardiol refused the offer and opted to stay in the Prva HNL and develop further. On 16 September, in a Champions League qualifier against Ferencváros, Gvardiol made an error that led to Myrto Uzuni's winning goal for 2–1 as the Hungarian champions knocked Dinamo out to the Europa League play-offs.

However, on 28 September, it was announced that Gvardiol signed for Bundesliga club RB Leipzig on a five-year contract for €16 million, plus various add-ons. The fee was the highest ever paid for a Croatian teenager and the third highest ever paid for a Croatian defender, only behind Dejan Lovren and Duje Ćaleta-Car. Gvardiol remained at Dinamo for the remainder of the season. On 22 October, he debuted for Dinamo in a senior UEFA competition, as Dinamo drew 0–0 with Feyenoord in the Europa League. On 16 November, Gvardiol tested positive for COVID-19, which forced him to miss the derby against Osijek, now coached by Bjelica, on 21 November. On 10 December, Gvardiol scored his first goal in a senior UEFA competition, as Dinamo defeated CSKA Moscow 3–1 in the Europa League. After completion of the Europa League group stage, Gvardiol's performances were highly praised, as Dinamo conceded only one goal and topped their group. On 28 February 2021, he scored the opening goal and assisted the third one in a 3–0 victory over Slaven Belupo. However, after a quadriceps injury in training in early March, he was forced to miss both legs of Dinamo's Europa League Round of 16 tie against Tottenham Hotspur, which Dinamo won 3–2 on aggregate. He returned for the quarter-final match against Villarreal on 8 April, which ended as a 1–0 loss. Three days later, he scored his third goal of the season in a 2–0 victory over Lokomotiva. On 22 May, Gvardiol played his last game for Dinamo, 1–0 victory over Šibenik.

RB Leipzig
Gvardiol made his Bundesliga debut on 20 August 2021 in a 4–0 victory over VfB Stuttgart, playing the entire match. He quickly established himself in Leipzig's starting XI and attracted attention with his good plays. On 15 September, he made his Champions League debut in a 6–3 defeat to Manchester City. On 11 December, he scored his debut goal for Leipzig in a 4–1 victory over Borussia Mönchengladbach. He significantly contributed to Leipzig's good form during the beginning of Domenico Tedesco's tenure as manager, after the poor start of the season during previous manager Jesse Marsch's term. On 23 January 2022, he scored his second goal of the season in a 2–0 victory over VfL Wolfsburg. By the end of the season, Gvardiol helped Leipzig win the DFB-Pokal and reach the semi-finals of the Europa League, accomplishing both feats for the first time in the history of the club. Furthermore, the DFB-Pokal victory was also the first major trophy title in the history of the club.

On 12 August, France Football announced Gvardiol as one of the nominees for the 2022 Kopa Trophy, where he eventually finished in sixth place. On 1 September, Gvardiol extended his contract with RB Leipzig until 2027, with the club having rejected Chelsea's €90 million offer for the player. On 25 October, Gvardiol scored his first ever Champions League goal in a 3–2 victory over Real Madrid. The game was Madrid's first defeat of the season. On 22 February 2023, Gvardiol scored an equalizer in a 1–1 draw with Manchester City in the Champions League round of 16. Aged , he became the youngest Croatian player ever to score in a Champions League knockout phase.

International career
Gvardiol earned his first call-up to Croatia national under-21 team in October 2019, at the age of 17, when coach Igor Bišćan listed him in the squad for Under-21 Euro 2021 qualifiers against Lithuania and the Czech Republic. Gvardiol debuted on 14 November against the former opponent, being named in the starting lineup, as Croatia won 3–1. On 8 October 2020, he scored the tenth goal in Croatia's 10–0 victory over San Marino, the largest victory in the history of the national team. On 9 March 2021, he was named in Bišćan's 23-man squad for the group stage of the tournament; however, he was forced to miss it due to a quadriceps injury. On 17 May, he was named in Bišćan's 23-man squad for the knockout stage of the tournament, as well as Zlatko Dalić's 26-man squad for the UEFA Euro 2020.

After losing 2–1 to Spain after extra time in the Under-21 Euro quarter-final, Gvardiol joined the senior team. He made his senior debut in a friendly 1–0 defeat to Belgium on 6 June, being substituted on for Borna Barišić at half-time. A week later, he earned his first start for the national team, in a 1–0 defeat to England in Croatia's opening game of Euro 2020. He went on to start all Croatia's games at the tournament. On 8 October 2021, he scored his debut goal for Croatia in a 3–0 World Cup qualifying victory over Cyprus.

On 9 November 2022, Gvardiol was named in Zlatko Dalić's 26-man squad for the 2022 FIFA World Cup. A day later, in a Bundesliga match against Freiburg, Gvardiol broke his nose after colliding with Willi Orbán and prominently wore a face mask during the tournament as a consequence. He received extended praise for his defensive performance in the group stage, especially in the decisive match against Belgium on 1 December that ended up as a goalless draw and saw Croatia qualify for the knockout stage for the third time in history. On 17 December, in the third place play-off against Morocco, Gvardiol scored his first goal for Croatia at a major tournament. He was named Man of the Match, as Croatia won 2–1 and claimed their second bronze and third overall World Cup medal in history. Despite being a favourite for the FIFA Young Player Award, he lost it to Enzo Fernández.

Career statistics
Club

International

Scores and results list Croatia's goal tally first, score column indicates score after each Gvardiol goal.

HonoursDinamo ZagrebPrva HNL: 2019–20, 2020–21
Croatian Cup: 2020–21
Croatian Super Cup: 2019RB LeipzigDFB-Pokal: 2021–22CroatiaFIFA World Cup third place: 2022Individual'
Trophy Footballer – Best Prva HNL U-21 player: 2021
Trophy Footballer – Team of the Year: 2021
IFFHS Men's World Team: 2022
IFFHS Men's World Youth (U20) Team: 2022

References

External links

Profile at the RB Leipzig website

Living people
2002 births
Footballers from Zagreb
Croatian footballers
Association football defenders
Croatia under-21 international footballers
Croatia youth international footballers
Croatia international footballers
GNK Dinamo Zagreb II players
GNK Dinamo Zagreb players
RB Leipzig players
First Football League (Croatia) players
Croatian Football League players
Bundesliga players
UEFA Euro 2020 players
2022 FIFA World Cup players
Croatian expatriate footballers
Croatian expatriate sportspeople in Germany
Expatriate footballers in Germany